Danger on Wheels is a 1940 American film noir sport film directed by Christy Cabanne and starring Richard Arlen and Andy Devine.

Plot
A test driver (Richard Arlen) tries racing with his girlfriend's (Peggy Moran) father's new engine.

Cast
 Richard Arlen as Larry Taylor
 Andy Devine as Gumpy Wesel
 Peggy Moran as Pat O'Shea 
 Vinton Hayworth as Bruce Crowley (as Jack Arnold)
 Herbert Corthell as Pop O'Shea
 Sandra King as June Allen
 Landers Stevens as Lloyd B. Allen
 Harry C. Bradley as Jones 
 Mary Treen as Esme
 John Holmes as Eddie Dodds
 Jack Rice as Parker

References

1940 films
American auto racing films
American drama films
1940 drama films
American black-and-white films
1940s American films
1940s English-language films